João M. P. Lemos is a Portuguese illustrator and comic book author.

He was a member of the former Bica Studio, in Lisbon. He did work for Marvel Comics designing, penciling and inking Avengers Fairy Tales #1, which was written by C. B. Cebulski.

Lemos has created set designs and storyboards for Kunta, a short film directed by Angelo Torres and also authored its credits and logo design.

Writer Midori Snyder compared Lemos' work to Erté's. Lemos is known for undertaking unusual amounts of research in most of his works.

Lemos illustrated the story book featured on 2011 ABC series Once Upon a Time.

References

External links 
Joao M. P. Lemos Sete-Estrelo blog
Spanish site’s page on Joao M. P. Lemos

Portuguese comics artists
Living people
Comic book limited series
Comics based on fairy tales
Year of birth missing (living people)